Hirpora Wildlife Sanctuary or Heerpora Wildlife Sanctuary is located, Hirpora in Shopian district of Jammu and Kashmir. It is bounded to the north by Lake Gumsar, northeast by Hirpora village, east by Rupri, south by Saransar and to the west by the Pir Panjal pass. The slopes are gentle to moderately steep on the eastern aspect and very steep with many cliffs on the higher northern and western aspect. The southern and southeastern portions are moderately steep. Heerpora wildlife sanctuary  is one of the beautiful wildlife sanctuary in Jammu and Kashmir

Flora 

The vegetation types present in the Hirpora Wildlife Sanctuary include western mixed coniferous forests, deciduous sub-alpine scrub forests and sub-alpine pastures. Western mixed coniferous forest is dominated by Kail pine with spruce and fir (Abies pindrow) as its primary associates. The West Himalayan sub-alpine forests are dominated by fir, while the deciduous sub-alpine scrub is dominated by Himalayan birch (Betula utilis) and juniper (Juniperus communis) with wild rose as an associate. The southeastern part has moderately open coniferous vegetation dominated by Kail pine and associated with fir and spruce. The vegetation of the more rocky and open northwestern portion is predominantly sub-alpine scrub forest dominated by juniper and the Kail pine as an associated species. Man-made sub-alpine pastures also occur in both north-western and south-eastern parts of the sanctuary.

Fauna 

The Hirpora Wildlife Sanctuary is an abode to many species of animals including the Himalayan brown bear,  Himalayan black bear, musk deer, leopard, Tibetan wolf, Himalayan palm civet and around 50 individuals the critically endangered Pir Panjal markhor. Besides, 130 species of birds including the spotted forktail, western tragopan, rock bunting, rufous-breasted accentor, Himalayan woodpecker, blue rock thrush, white-capped redstart, Himalayan griffon, common stonechat, red-billed blue magpie and grey wagtail are found in the sanctuary.

Disturbance 

The Mughal Road cuts through the Hirpora Wildlife Sanctuary and is believed to inhibit the movement of animals, especially the critically endangered Pir Panjal markhor. The Sanctuary has also been disturbed due to deforestation, excessive livestock grazing and construction of permanent huts by the Gujjars, Bakerwals and local shepherds.

Gallery

See also 

Dachigam National Park
Overa-Aru Wildlife Sanctuary
Gulmarg Wildlife Sanctuary
Kishtwar National Park

References

External links 

Kashmir’s iconic Markhor goat on critically endangered list

Wildlife sanctuaries in Jammu and Kashmir
Shopian district
Protected areas established in 1987
1987 establishments in Jammu and Kashmir